"Loyal" is a song by Canadian singer PartyNextDoor featuring fellow Canadian singer and rapper Drake. It was released as the lead single from the former's third studio album Partymobile (2020) on November 21, 2019, by OVO Sound and Warner Records, alongside the release of "The News". The song was produced by OG Parker, DreGotJuice and 40. It reached the top 20 in Canada, the top 40 in the UK and number 63 on the US Billboard Hot 100. A remix featuring Puerto Rican rapper Bad Bunny was later released in February 2020.

Critical reception
Charles Holmes of Rolling Stone judged that the song keeps PartyNextDoor's "tropical pop and drastic AutoTune vocal runs [...] intact, but there's also a new sense of sweetness". Jordan Darville of The Fader wrote that the track "combined PartyNextDoor's talent for the left-of-center with his impeccable pop instincts, which were boosted by a feature from Drake".

Charts

Weekly charts

Year-end charts

Certifications

References

2019 singles
2019 songs
Drake (musician) songs
PartyNextDoor songs
Song recordings produced by 40 (record producer)
Songs written by Drake (musician)
Songs written by 40 (record producer)
Songs written by OG Parker
Songs written by PartyNextDoor

Song recordings produced by OG Parker
Dancehall songs